Elsie Audrey Mosson (3 September 1920, Preston – 1 September 2009, Hastings) was an English teen celebrity and later a professional dancer.

Biography

Mosson was born in Preston, Lancashire, she was crowned the 10th Railway Queen of Great Britain at the Railway Carnival and Pageant held at Belle Vue, Manchester in August 1935 when she was 15 years old. Later in 1935, she turned on the Blackpool Illuminations, an annual lights festival in Blackpool. 50 years later, she again turned on the Blackpool Illuminations alongside actress Joanna Lumley.

In 1936, she travelled to the Soviet Union on a peace visit and met Joseph Stalin.

She made her stage debut with the Blackpool Tower Children's Ballet.

Audrey and her two sisters all married on the same day at a triple wedding at St Peter's, Blackpool in 1940. It was also their parents wedding anniversary.

Popular culture
Mosson features in the children's books Gracie Fairshaw and the Mysterious Guest and Gracie Fairshaw and the Trouble at the Tower by author Susan Brownrigg.

Notes

References

1920 births
2009 deaths
Entertainers from Preston, Lancashire
English beauty pageant winners
English female dancers